Alfa Financial Software Holdings plc is a business providing software for customers working in the asset finance industry. It is listed on the London Stock Exchange.

History 
The company was founded by Justin Cooper, Ian Hargrave and Andrew Page as CHP Consulting in 1990 and was then rebranded as Alfa Financial Software in November 2016. It was the subject of an initial public offering in summer 2017.

Trading as Alfa, the company provides software to asset finance customers in 18 countries and has offices in London, Detroit, Los Angeles and Auckland.

References

External links 
 

Software companies established in 1990
Financial services companies based in the City of London
1990 establishments in the United Kingdom
Companies listed on the London Stock Exchange